Rhombocorniculum is a species of small shelly fossil comprising twisted ornamented cones.  It has been described from the Comely limestone and elsewhere.  R. cancellatum straddles the Atdabanian/Botomian boundary.  The structure of its inner layer suggests that its phosphatic fibres formed within a flexible organic matrix.

Taxonomy

Three species are recognized — in stratigraphic succession: R. insolutum, R. cancellatum (=R. walliseri), and R. spinosus (=Rushtonites spinosus).  Landing (1995) refers R. insolutum to the strictocorniculids, along with Rushtonites.  Hinz (1987) considers insolutum to fall within the variability seen in cancellatum.

Affinity 
Based on details of the ornament and construction, Rhombocorniculum is interpreted as the spines of a Hallucigenia-like lobopodian worm.

See also 

Mongolitubulus

References

Prehistoric animal genera
Cambrian animals of Europe